Emesene may refer to:

 an inhabitant of ancient Emesa (modern-day Homs), Syria
 Emesene dynasty
 Emesene helmet
 Emesene kingdom
 Emesene necropolis